The map of Juan de la Cosa is a world map that includes the earliest known representation of the New World and the first depiction of the equator and the Tropic of Cancer on a nautical chart. The map is attributed to the Castilian navigator and cartographer, Juan de la Cosa, and was likely created in 1500.

Description

Juan de la Cosa's map is a manuscript nautical chart of the world drawn on two joined sheets of parchment sewn onto a canvas backing. It measures 96 cm high by 183 cm wide. A legend written in Spanish at the western edge of the map translates as "Juan de la Cosa made this (map) in the port of Santa Maria in the year 1500". The overall style is similar to other contemporary charts of the Mediterranean, especially maps produced in Majorca, an important center of map making at the time.

The map is an assemblage of two different charts, one covering the Old World and the Atlantic as far west as the Azores and the other representing the New World. The New World is colored in green while the Old World has been left uncolored. The Old World map includes discoveries made up to 1488 but the New World is current up to 1500. The two maps are also drawn at different scales, the New World chart larger than its Old World counterpart. It contains the earliest known depiction of the equator and the Tropic of Cancer on a nautical chart.

The portrayal of Europe, Africa, and Asia is unremarkable. The outlines of Europe and the Mediterranean Sea were certainly copied from portolan charts widely available at the time. The western and southern coasts of Africa show up-to-date knowledge of Portuguese explorations, but the eastern coast of the continent is badly distorted. Asia and the Indian Ocean reflect the Ptolemaic mapping tradition.

While the mapping of the Old World is routine, the inclusion of the New World is an important milestone in cartography. Cosa's map is the earliest surviving representation of the Americas. It is also the only known cartographic work made by an eyewitness of the first voyages of Christopher Columbus. Cosa also participated in the 1496 voyage of Alonso de Ojeda along the coast of South America. In addition, he takes into account the explorations of John Cabot, Vicente Pinzon, and Pedro Álvares Cabral. The appropriate national flags were drawn on the map to attribute the discovery of each region.

North America is depicted as a landmass extending far into the North Atlantic, and South America appears to be a continent but both are drawn in such a way that they could represent an extension of Asia and not entirely new continents. The Caribbean islands of Cuba, Hispaniola, and Puerto Rico are rendered with some accuracy. In particular, Cuba is drawn correctly as an island, which contradicts Columbus, who stated that it was a peninsula of Asia. The first recorded circumnavigation of Cuba did not occur until 1508.

The region of Central America is covered with an image of Saint Christopher bearing the infant Christ across the water. This can be read as an allusion to Christopher Columbus bringing Christianity across the Atlantic. It also serves to leave open the possibility that a passage to the Indian Ocean exists in the region. Columbus firmly believed in this passage and the promise of easy access to the lucrative spice trade was probably what convinced the Catholic Monarchs to fund a fourth (and final) voyage for Columbus. 

Columbus may have presented the chart to the Catholic Monarchs in 1503 and then later it was passed on to Juan Rodríguez de Fonseca, the councilor to the king. Nothing else is known of the map until it was purchased from a junk shop dealer in Paris by Baron Charles-Athanase Walckenaer early in the nineteenth century. In 1832 the German naturalist Alexander von Humboldt first identified it as an important historical document. It was purchased by the Spanish government in 1853 and is part of the collection of the Naval Museum in Madrid.

See also
Ancient world maps
World map
Cantino planisphere

References

Bibliography

Non-English

External links 
 Chart of Juan de la Cosa (1500)- Museo Naval, Madrid
 Chart of Juan de la Cosa: The First Known Map of America, Google Arts and Culture.
 J. Siebold, Slide #305 Monograph

16th-century maps and globes
Cosa
Collections of the Naval Museum of Madrid
1500 works